Villarquemado is a municipality located in the province of Teruel, Aragon, Spain. According to the 2004 census (INE), the municipality had a population of 938 inhabitants.  It is located 24 km from the capital, Teruel. It covers 56.43 km2 and its population density is 16.66 inhabitants / km2.

References

Municipalities in the Province of Teruel